The Sheepdogs is the fourth studio album and major label debut by Canadian rock band The Sheepdogs. The album was released on September 4, 2012. The album debuted at #1 in Canada. The album was certified Gold in Canada on March 6, 2013. The album was nominated for Rock Album of the Year at the 2013 Juno Awards.

Production
The album was produced by Patrick Carney, the drummer for the blues rock band The Black Keys, and Rolling Stone editor Austin Scaggs.

The album was mixed by Tchad Blake.

In popular culture
The song "Feeling Good" is featured on NASCAR The Game: Inside Line and NHL 17. The National Hockey League's Toronto Maple Leafs also used the song as their goal song during the 2015–16 season, and the Toronto Blue Jays likewise used "Feeling Good" as their victory song in 2015.

Track listing
All song written by Ewan Currie.

Certifications

References

The Sheepdogs albums
2012 albums
Albums produced by Patrick Carney